The Kolej Vokasional Ipoh (formerly known as Sekolah Menengah Teknik Ipoh) is a public vocational college based in Ipoh, Perak, Malaysia.

The school was built in the early 1970s to educate and produce engineers. Its objectives are to provide Malaysia with a students who are equipped with a strong technical background and to teach students about basic engineering concepts.

External links
 

Vocational colleges in Malaysia
Universities and colleges in Perak
Technical universities and colleges in Malaysia
Engineering universities and colleges in Malaysia